Dwight Perry (born November 9, 1987) is an American basketball player and coach. He is the interim head coach of the Wofford Terriers men's basketball team.

Playing career
Perry played three years at Kentucky. He played in 19 games for the Wildcats, averaging 0.3 points, 0.2 rebounds, and 0.1 assists per game.

Coaching career
He started out as an intern for Stanford and he coached there for two years. Then he became a graduate assistant for VCU, he would coach there for three years. Next he became an assistant coach for Furman for five years. On April 18, 2019, Wofford hired Perry as an assistant coach. On September 10, 2021, the Terriers promoted Perry to Associate Head Coach. After head coach Jay McAuley resigned after taking a month long leave of absence, Perry was promoted to head coach on December 5, 2022.

Head coaching record

References

1987 births
Living people
American men's basketball coaches
American men's basketball players
College men's basketball head coaches in the United States
VCU Rams men's basketball coaches
Furman Paladins men's basketball coaches
Stanford Cardinal men's basketball coaches
Kentucky Wildcats men's basketball players
Wofford Terriers men's basketball coaches